The Nanfang Daily, also known as Southern Daily and Nanfang Ribao, is the official newspaper of the Guangdong provincial committee of the Chinese Communist Party. The paper was established in Guangzhou on October 23, 1949.

On October 15, 1949, Ye Jianying arrived in Guangzhou, surrounded and disarmed all speculators, and arrested more than ten journalists for re-education. The premises and equipment of the Kuomintang's Central Daily were immediately seized and taken over. The paper was changed to Nanfang Daily, first published on October 23.

The newspaper is eponymous to the more lively and commercial Southern Metropolis Daily and part of the giant Nanfang Daily Newspaper Group. In March 2018, Nanfang Daily won the Third National Top 100 Newspapers in China.

An article from Brown University pointed out that Nanfang Daily has superior reporting and a somewhat higher level of frankness than many mainstream press outlets of the People's Republic of China.

See also
 Hua Shang Daily, predecessor of Southern Daily

References

External links
 

1949 establishments in China
Chinese-language newspapers (Simplified Chinese)
Chinese Communist Party newspapers
Daily newspapers published in China
Newspapers established in 1949